Tagwana (Tagbana) is a southern Senufo language of Ivory Coast. It is closely related to Djimini.

References

Tagwana–Djimini languages
Languages of Ivory Coast